Paddy Moran (born 28 May 1967) is a former Gaelic footballer who played for the Whitehall Colmcille club and for the Dublin county team, operating from full-back and centre-back. He was a member of the 1995 All-Ireland winning Dublin team. He won a National League in 1993 and 4 Leinster medals from 1992–1995.

References

1967 births
Living people
Dublin inter-county Gaelic footballers
Gaelic football backs
Whitehall Colmcille Gaelic footballers
People educated at St Aidan's C.B.S.
Winners of one All-Ireland medal (Gaelic football)